Freetown is an electoral constituency in the Belize District represented in the House of Representatives of the National Assembly of Belize since 2003 by Francis Fonseca of the People's United Party. Fonseca served as PUP leader and Leader of the Opposition from 2011 to 2016.

Profile

The Freetown constituency was created for the 1961 general election as part of a major nationwide redistricting. The constituency hugs the Caribbean Sea shoreline on the northwest outskirts of Belize City, also taking in some of the city center. It borders the Belize Rural Central, Lake Independence, Pickstock, Fort George and Caribbean Shores constituencies.

Freetown was represented by longtime People's United Party leader and Prime Minister George Cadle Price from 1961 to 1984, when he was upset by the United Democratic Party's Derek Aikman, a relative political newcomer. Aikman was one of two UDP area representatives who defected to the newly created National Alliance for Belizean Rights party in early 1992.

A by-election was held in January 1993 after Aikman was expelled from the House for bankruptcy. At that election the seat returned to PUP control.

Area Representatives

Elections

References

British Honduras Legislative Assembly constituencies established in 1961
Political divisions in Belize
Freetown (Belize House constituency)
1961 establishments in British Honduras